Raymond Coy Poage Jr. (November 14, 1940 – September 23, 1997) was an American football tight end in the National Football League.  

He was drafted  out of the University of Texas by the Vikings in the 1963 NFL Draft.

Poage played portions of eight seasons in the NFL, peaking in 1964 and 1965 with over 1,000 yards off 68 receptions for the Philadelphia Eagles.

References

External links
 

1940 births
1997 deaths
People from Plainview, Texas
American football tight ends
Texas Longhorns football players
Minnesota Vikings players
Philadelphia Eagles players
New Orleans Saints players
Atlanta Falcons players
Players of American football from Texas